Closterotomus is a genus of plant bugs belonging to the family Miridae, subfamily Mirinae.

Species
Closterotomus annulus (Brullé, 1832)
Closterotomus biclavatus (Herrich-Schäffer, 1835)
Closterotomus cinctipes (A. Costa, 1853)
Closterotomus costae (Reuter, 1888)
Closterotomus fulvomaculatus (De Geer, 1773)
Closterotomus histrio (Reuter, 1877)
Closterotomus krueperi (Reuter, 1880)
Closterotomus migrans (Lindberg, 1948)
Closterotomus norwegicus (Gmelin, 1790)
Closterotomus picturatus (Reuter, 1896)
Closterotomus princeps (Reuter, 1880)
Closterotomus putoni (Horváth, 1888)
Closterotomus reuteri (Horváth, 1882)
Closterotomus samojedorum (J. Sahlberg, 1878)
Closterotomus trivialis (A. Costa, 1853)
Closterotomus tunetanus (Wagner, 1942)
Closterotomus ventralis (Reuter, 1879)
Closterotomus venustus (Fieber, 1861)
Closterotomus vicinus (Horváth, 1876)

Gallery

External links
 BioLib
 Fauna Europaea

Miridae genera
Mirini